Cone crater is a small crater in the Fra Mauro highlands, north of Fra Mauro crater, on the Moon.  The name of the crater was formally adopted by the IAU in 1973.

The Apollo 14 astronauts Alan Shepard and Edgar Mitchell landed the Lunar Module (LM) Antares southwest of Cone crater on February 5, 1971.  During the descent, Cone crater was a major landmark.  Sampling ejecta from Cone was a primary scientific goal of the mission, as Cone would have penetrated the lunar regolith (soil) and brought some of the Fra Mauro Formation to the surface.  The Fra Mauro Formation is interpreted as ejecta from the Imbrium impact event - an important time-stratigraphic marker in lunar history.  The astronauts attempted to reach Cone on their second EVA, and came very close to it and sampled the ejecta. But due to confusing topography they never reached the rim of the crater.

Gallery

References

Impact craters on the Moon
Apollo 14